The Evergreen F class is a series of 20 container ships being built for Evergreen Marine. The ships have a maximal theoretical capacity of around 12,100 TEU. The first ship of this class was delivered in 2020 and built by Samsung Heavy Industries in South Korea. Samsung Heavy Industries will build 8 ships in total. A further 12 ships will be built by Imabari Shipbuilding at their Marugame and Hiroshima shipyards with delivery starting in 2021.

List of ships

See also 

 Ever Golden-class container ship-Largest container ship of Evergreen Marine prior to 2021
Ever E-class
Ever G-class
Ever S-class
Ever L-class
Ever B-class
Ever A-class-Largest container ship of Evergreen Marine and largest container ship in the world
 Triton-class container ship
 Thalassa Hellas-class container ship

References 

Container ship classes
Ships built by Samsung Heavy Industries